This is a list of the first women lawyer(s) and judge(s) in Montana. It includes the year in which the women were admitted to practice law (in parentheses). Also included are women who achieved other distinctions such becoming the first in their state to graduate from law school or become a political figure.

Firsts in Montana's history

Law School 

 First female law graduate: Edna Rankin McKinnon (1919)

Lawyers 

First female: Ella Knowles Haskell (1888)  
First Native American (Crow Nation) female: Mary Frances Garrigus (c. 1918)

Law Clerk 

 First female to clerk for a Supreme Court of Montana justice: Betty Ann Sias (1945)

State judges 

First female (Thirteenth Judicial District): Diane Barz (1968) in 1978  
First Native American (Navajo) female elected (justice court): Joey Jayne 
First female (Montana Supreme Court): Diane Barz (1968) in 1989  
First female (youngest): Shannen Rossmiller in 2000
First female (Chief Justice; Montana Supreme Court): Karla M. Gray (1976) in 2000 
First female (Twelfth Judicial District): Kaydee Snipes Ruiz (2011) in 2019

Federal judges 
First female (federal magistrate): Carolyn Ostby (1981) in 2002
First female (U.S. District Court of Montana): Susan P. Watters (1988) in 2014

Assistant Attorney General 

 First female: Ella Knowles Haskell (1888) in 1893

United States Attorney 

 First female: Doris S. Poppler (1948) in 1990

County Attorney 

First female: Emily E. Sloan (1919) in 1924

State Bar of Montana 

 First female admitted: Edna Rankin McKinnon (1919) 
 First female president: Sherry Matteucci

Firsts in local history
 Karen Townsend: First female elected as a Judge of the Fourth Judicial District (2011) [Missoula and Mineral Counties, Montana]
 Kitty Curtis: First female judge in Flathead County, Montana (1994)
 Deborah Kim Christopher: First female to serve as the Lake County Attorney, Montana (1991)
 Jennifer Boatwright-Lint: First female to serve as a district court judge in Ravalli County, Montana (2018)

See also  

 List of first women lawyers and judges in the United States
 Timeline of women lawyers in the United States
 Women in law

Other topics of interest 

 List of first minority male lawyers and judges in the United States
 List of first minority male lawyers and judges in Montana

References 

Lawyers, Montana, first
Montana, first
Women, Montana, first
Women, Montana, first
Women in Montana
first women lawyers and judges
Montana lawyers